Battle's Clarion is the second full-length studio release from Texan black metal band Averse Sefira.  Originally released by Lost Disciple in 2001, it was picked up and reissued by Candlelight in 2007 (Candelight being their label now).

Track listing
All Songs Written & Arranged By Averse Sefira.
"Battle's Clarion" 5:12
"Condemned to Glory" 4:30
"Withering, The Storm" (interlude) 2:03
"Deathymn" 5:18
"The Nascent Ones-The Age of Geburah" 5:18
"Argument Obscura" 5:44
"The Thousand Aeon Stare" 1:33
"Fallen Beneath the Earth" 3:52
"...Ablaze" 3:35

Personnel

Averse Sefira
Sanguine Asmodel Nocturne: Guitars, Vocals
Lady Of The Evening Faces: Keyboards, Effects, Interludes
Wrath Sathariel Diabolus: Bass, Vocals
The Carcass: Drums

Additional Personnel
MkM (of Antaeus), Lord Imperial: Additional Vocals on track 4

Production
Produced By Averse Sefira
Recorded By Stuart Lawrence
Mastered By Brendan Bigelow

References

2001 albums
Averse Sefira albums
Candlelight Records albums